The Homegrown Player Rule is a rule for UEFA competitions that was first introduced in 2006–07 season and fully enforced beginning in the 2008–09 season. On top of a maximum 25 players for List A, clubs had to designate a minimum 8 players that were trained by clubs from the same national league, with 4 of them being from the club's own youth system. The rule in turn capped a maximum of 17 foreigners for the club in UEFA competitions.

The English Premier League enforced their own version beginning in 2010.

Definition
UEFA defines locally-trained or 'homegrown' players as those who, regardless of their nationality, have been trained by their club or by another club in the same national association for at least three years between the ages of 15 and 21.

References

Further reading
 

UEFA